Class 121 may refer to:

British Rail Class 121
CIE 121 Class
Haixiu 121-class tug
I-121-class submarine
RENFE Class 120 / 121